AC-9 may refer to:

 USS Proteus (AC-9), a US Navy collier ship
 Southern Pacific class AC-9, a model of steam locomotive
 AC-9, an IEC utilization category